is a 2013 Japanese drama film directed by Shinji Aoyama, starring Masaki Suda. It is based on the Akutagawa Prize-winning novel by Shinya Tanaka and adapted by Haruhiko Arai. The film won the Best Director award from the Swiss critics' federation and the Best Film award from the Junior Jury's at the 2013 Locarno International Film Festival.

Plot 
Toma (Masaki Suda) lives with his father, Madoka (Ken Mitsuishi), and Madoka's lover, Kotoko (Yukiko Kinoshita) on the riverside in Shimonoseki, Yamaguchi Prefecture. Toma's mother, Jinko (Yūko Tanaka), resides on the other side of the bridge, making a living by cleaning fish. Madoka routinely beats and chokes women when having a sex. As Madoka's son, Toma is afraid of becoming like his father.

On his 17th birthday in 1988, Toma has sex with his girlfriend, Chigusa (Misaki Kinoshita).

Cast 
 Masaki Suda as Toma
 Misaki Kinoshita as Chigusa
 Yukiko Shinohara as Kotoko
 Ken Mitsuishi as Madoka
 Yūko Tanaka as Jinko
 Ittoku Kishibe as Detective

Production 
The song "Torna a Surriento" was used in the closing credits of the film.

Release 
The film screened in competition at the 2013 Locarno International Film Festival.

Reception 
Jinshi Fujii of Yomiuri Shimbun praised the film, noting that "Aoyama has succeeded in transmigrating the tradition of Japanese film through something more than mere repetition." Meanwhile, Dan Fainaru of Screen International felt that "the script relies mostly on its female characters that are unsurprisingly far more alive and interesting than the men in their lives, and the same goes for the performances of the three lead actresses."

References

External links 
 
 

2013 films
Films directed by Shinji Aoyama
Japanese drama films
Films with screenplays by Haruhiko Arai
2010s Japanese films